La Misma Gente is a Venezuelan rock band formed in the 1970s. Their best known hit is "Lluvia".

References

Venezuelan musical groups